Between the Glory and the Flame is an album by Randy Stonehill, released in 1981, on Myrrh Records.

Track listing
All songs written by Randy Stonehill, except "Givin' It Up For Love" and "Farther On" which were written by Randy Stonehill and Tom Howard.

Side one
 "Glory and the Flame"  – 3:10
 "Die Young"  – 3:15
 "Fifth Avenue Breakdown"  – 2:50
 "Grandfather's Song"  – 3:24
 "Find Your Way to Me" – 3:42

Side two
 "Christine"  – 3:29
 "Rainbow"  – 3:49
 "Givin' It Up for Love"  – 4:13
 "Letter to My Family"  – 4:58
 "Farther On"  – 2:56

This album has not been released on CD.

Personnel 
 Randy Stonehill – lead vocals (1, 2, 3, 5, 7, 8, 9), backing vocals (1, 2, 3, 5, 7, 8), electric 12-string guitar (1), rhythm guitar (1, 2, 3, 7, 8), percussion (2), all vocals (4, 6, 10), lead guitar (3), guitars (5, 6, 9), acoustic guitar (10)
 Tom Howard – backing vocals (3, 5, 7), acoustic piano (4), harmonium (4), string arrangements (4, 9), synthesizers (7), acoustic guitar (10)

with Daniel Amos
 Jerry Chamberlain – lead guitar (1, 2, 3, 8), backing vocals (1, 2, 3, 5, 7, 8), rhythm guitar (3, 7, 8)
 Terry Scott Taylor – electric slide guitar (7)
 Marty Dieckmeyer – bass (1, 2, 3, 5, 7, 8, 10)
 Ed McTaggart – drums (1, 2, 3, 5, 7, 8, 10), percussion (2, 3, 7)
 Alex MacDougall – percussion (1, 5, 10)

Production 
 Terry Scott Taylor – producer (for "Rebel Base Productions")
 Thom Roy – engineer
 White Field Studios – recording and mixing location
 Frank Ordaz – painting and artwork
 Daniel Amos appears courtesy of ¡Alarma! Records
 Terry Jonsson – Newscaster on "Christine"
 The "Whisper People" – whispers on "Rainbow"

References

1981 albums
Randy Stonehill albums